Cervini is a tribe of deer, containing seven extant genera and several extinct ones. The most recent common ancestor of Cervini is presumed to have three-pointed antlers with the brow tine, the trez tine and the beam.

Phylogeny
Phylogeny by Gilbert et al. (2006)  is as follows;

References 

Cervinae
Mammal tribes